Pagorzyna , formerly Pogorzyna, is a village in the administrative district of Gmina Lipinki, within Gorlice County, Lesser Poland Voivodeship, in southern Poland.

The village has a population of 740.

References

Villages in Gorlice County